DWET (106.7 FM), on-air as 106.7 Energy FM, is a radio station in the Philippines, owned and operated by Ultrasonic Broadcasting System. Its studios and offices are located at Unit A, 3rd Floor, E-Square Bldg., 416 Ortigas Ave., Brgy. Greenhills, San Juan, while its transmitter is located at Unit D-1, 15th Floor, Strata 2000 Bldg., F. Ortigas Jr. Ave., Ortigas Center, Pasig. This station operates 24/7.

History

1992–1999: The first Kool 106
When Kool 106 first went on-air on February 21, 1992 (together with ABC 5) with radio veteran George Mercado (George Boone) at the helm, its format was Hot Adult Contemporary, playing a mix of Top 40 hits and music from the 70s and 80s, alongside back then. In 1995, when Marc Gorospe (who currently works as program manager of DWAD 1098) assumed the Station Manager post, Kool 106 flipped into contemporary hit radio.

1999–2001: 106.7 Kool
It changed to 106.7 Kool between March 1999 and April 2001, playing mostly R&B music from abroad and very few OPM hits. The station underwent a complete format change and a one-month hiatus in April 2001.

2001-2002: Rio 106.7
It became known as Ritmo Latino Rio 106.7, the first radio station in the country that played Latin music.

2002–2004: The second Kool 106
In April 2002, Kool 106 resurrected as a masa station. During the relaunch, Kool 106 and ABC-5 teamed up to produce a 30-minute interactive music show called "Kool on Kam", originally aired as a hookup with Kool 106 where the jocks can now be seen on TV with music videos. On June 3, 2002, Kool on Kam moved to a primetime slot and increased to 1 hour, where the jocks interviews with its featured celebrity of the week and the show launched its segments. Kool on Kam lasted for a year and a half. The station also has its first ever countdown separated where the top 10 OPM songs and top 10 foreign songs are aired at noontime and 6pm respectively on Sundays. Kool 106 has also developed its "By Request" program aired weekdays 9pm-12mn and Sundays where listeners can call and ask for their requested song. Kool 106 as a masa station lasted for 2 years and made their final broadcast on July 31, 2004, as they bid farewell to give thanks to their loyal listeners for the past 12 years.

On August 1, 2004, DWET-FM was temporarily rebranded as ABC Radio on 106.7, as part of its transition. It stunted by playing a mix of classic hits, smooth jazz (which was also played by Dream FM) and orchestra.

2004–2011: 106.7 Dream FM

On September 7, 2004, 11 months after Tonyboy Cojuangco took over the management of ABC, 106.7 FM was reformatted as '106.7 Dream FM. The station aired a smooth jazz format added up with R&B, Soul, Bossa Nova and House and carried the slogan Your Comfortable Choice. It was also home of Smooth Jazz Top 20 hosted by Allen Kepler and Turbo Time.

After PLDT's media subsidiary MediaQuest Holdings, Inc. acquired TV5 and its affiliate ABC television stations from the consortium led by the Cojuangco group and Malaysia-based broadcaster Media Prima Berhad in March 2010, Dream FM and its regional stations were spun off to become Dream FM Network, led by former ABC stockholder Anton Lagdameo. The ownership of the stations were transferred to Interactive Broadcast Media, after Cojuangco acquired a non-controlling share of the company. The station continued to use TV5's Novaliches studios throughout the rest of Dream FM's run.

After seven years on air, Dream FM signed off for the last time on June 30, 2011, with "Till We Meet Again" by Eric Benét as its swansong.

2011–present: 106.7 Energy FM
Throughout the last week of June, plugs were aired on 106.7 FM with the statement "Si Pangga, Dreaming!", where the slogan of Energy FM Pangga and Dream FM's name is used. It was later discovered that IBMI leased the station's airtime to Ultrasonic Broadcasting System, Inc., a broadcast entity managed by the SYSU Group of Companies (who also owns local distribution of several food and seasoning product brands as well as selling Christian-oriented products). The agreement went into effect after UBSI general manager Manuelito "Manny" Luzon severed ties with the company to manage his newest venture, 107.5 Win Radio (now Wish 107.5) through his newly founded Zimzam Management. Cojuangco and the SYSU Group then went to a transitory partnership (reflected on the station's initial branding as Energy FM on Dream 106.7) until UBSI fully took control of the station.

Energy FM, a brand that used to air on Mabuhay Broadcasting System-owned DWKY 91.5 FM through an airtime lease deal, transferred to 106.7 FM on July 1, 2011. Its programs and DJs premiered on July 4, with Craig David's "Insomnia" as its first ever song played on the station. Kenji (Mark Bayquen) was the lone jock from the Dream FM roster who joined the Energy FM staff (he later reduced his duty to voiceover activities for Energy FM's promos as well as on other radio and TV clients).

Energy FM was credited as the 1st station to promote K-Pop in the Philippines, through its radio segment called KPOP Sarap. Initially an hourly segment of Ray Mambo's Radioactive Countdown, it expanded into a 2-hour segment. After Mambo left the station, it became a fully fledged KPOP-program. However, it eventually got removed in 2017 to give way for the 24-hour Pinoy Playbor OPM music block on Saturdays.

On March 17, 2014, the station launched its new tagline, Ang Sarap! Ang Sharap!, inspired by photo sharing site Instagram. The new imaging, however, resulted to a different approach in its programming. Part of the big consequence was that most of the station's veteran jocks (except Mr. Fu) were dismissed including Cathy G and DJ Mac; followed by hiring new jocks from other masa stations. Marketing Consultant Joee "Brother Joe" Guilas aimed the station to serve its listeners with a new menu of fun and entertainment, which was never heard on radio before. The tagline was later reverted to the current one as the former proved to be unfamiliar with its listeners.

In May 2014, CJ Santos briefly joined the station as Prinsipe Pegasus to help promote Digmaan Lusob Mola.

On March 20, 2017, major changes occurred at the station as former 90.7 Love Radio DJ John Gemperle, who was known on the air as Papa Jack, joined the station as Papa J, which later changed to Papa Jackson (using the suffix -son to his former Papa Jack moniker) a month later. Long-time DJ Jeffrey Espiritu, known for his Mr. Fu monicker, subsequently left the station and returned to the former 91.5 FM that Energy FM left, albeit working under the new Win Radio management. On May 8, 2017, former Yes FM 101.1 (now 101.1 Yes The Best) and Tag 91.1 DJ Mark Jimel Gales, known by many as Chico Loco, also joined the station as Kuya Chico. Following significant listenership  gains in the ratings, on October 29, 2018, Gemperle was promoted as Energy FM's station manager.

SAVED Radio (2011–2017) 

Energy FM was the first home station of Saved Radio which plays Christian music of praise and worship. Produced by Becca Music Inc., a Christian multimedia company founded by UBSI's chair Rebecca Sy, it first aired on February 6, 2011 (while Energy FM was still on 91.5 FM) as a Sunday evening program titled Saved on Energy FM and was initially aired between 9pm to 12mn. When the show transferred to DWET, it expanded into a four-hour radio show, then expanded to six hours a few months after. By 2014, Becca Music renamed the show as SAVED Radio on Energy FM, along with a refreshed lineup of programs for each hour including its known portion entitled "The Worship Hour". In mid-2015, SAVED Radio expanded its airtime to 18 hours on Sundays and introducing new programs with radio jocks hired separately from the Energy FM roster. Gaining positive feedback from its listeners, SAVED Radio finally became full-time a few weeks later, when it occupied the remaining Sunday airtime of Energy FM's programming. However, it continued to air as a blocktime show on Energy FM and not as a separate broadcaster nor airtime operator. Also, despite its expansion in Manila, SAVED Radio remained to be a late-night Sunday show on Energy FM's provincial stations.

On December 24, 2017, through Saved Radio's Facebook page, Becca Music announced that Saved Radio would temporarily leave the FM radio band after December 31. No other details were revealed except for its upcoming return by 2018, yet the outcome of the FM relaunch is still unknown to this date. As a compromise, though, Becca Music sets up an exclusive daily online streaming service on the Saved Radio website to allow loyal listeners of the program to continue listening on contemporary Christian music. By New Year's Day 2018, Saved Radio converted into an online radio service; while Energy FM reoccupied the network's Sunday lineup, the first after two years (though, it continues to inform listeners on Saved Radio's online streaming promos).

References

External links
 

OPM formatted radio stations in the Philippines
Energy FM
Radio stations established in 1992